Luke Caudillo (born November 30, 1980) is an American former mixed martial artist. He competed in the lightweight division.

Mixed martial arts career

Ultimate Fighting Championship

Caudillo made his UFC debut at UFC Fight Night 10 on June 12, 2007, against fellow prospect Nate Mohr. He lost the fight by unanimous decision. Caudillo then faced former Pride fighter Marcus Aurelio at UFC 78 on November 17, 2007. Caudillo lost the fight via TKO (punches) in the first round, and was released from the promotion shortly after.

Post-UFC career

Caudillo last fought on June 29, 2012, when he faced Thierry Quenneville. He lost by unanimous decision.

Mixed martial arts record

|-
|Loss
|align=center|17–17
|Thierry Quenneville
|Decision (unanimous)
|Instinct MMA - Instinct Fighting 4
|
|align=center|3
|align=center|5:00
|Montreal, Quebec, Canada
|
|-
|Win
|align=center|17–16
|Steve Granieri
|KO (knee)
|Fight To Win: Outlaws
|
|align=center|2
|align=center|1:04
|Denver, Colorado, United States
|
|-
|Loss
|align=center|16–16
|Sean Wilson
|TKO (punches)
|ROF 37: Warlords
|
|align=center|2
|align=center|1:15
|Omaha, Nebraska, United States
|
|-
|Win
|align=center|16–15
|Jordan Eggli
|Submission (punches)
|Midwest Championship Fighting: Perdition
|
|align=center|1
|align=center|3:23
|North Platte, Nebraska, United States
|
|-
|Loss
|align=center|15–15
|Gideon Ray
|Decision (unanimous)
|Raw Power - MMA
|
|align=center|3
|align=center|5:00
|Sanabis, Bahrain
|
|-
|Loss
|align=center|15–14
|Josh Arocho
|Submission (rear-naked choke)
|ROF 34: Judgment Day
|
|align=center|2
|align=center|3:25
|Broomfield, Colorado, United States
|
|-
|Loss
|align=center|15–13
|Billy Evangelista
|Decision (unanimous)
|Strikeforce: Payback
|
|align=center|3
|align=center|5:00
|Denver, Colorado, United States
|
|-
|Loss
|align=center|15–12
|Torrance Taylor
|Submission (rear-naked choke)
|ROF 32: Respect
|
|align=center|3
|align=center|3:10
|Broomfield, Colorado, United States
|
|-
|Loss
|align=center|15–11
|Marcus Aurélio
|TKO (punches)
|UFC 78
|
|align=center|1
|align=center|4:29
|Newark, New Jersey, United States
|
|-
|Loss
|align=center|15–10
|Nate Mohr
|Decision (unanimous)
|UFC Fight Night 10
|
|align=center|3
|align=center|5:00
|Hollywood, Florida, United States
|
|-
|Win
|align=center|15–9
|Dennis Davis
|Decision (split)
|ROF 29: Aftershock
|
|align=center|3
|align=center|5:00
|Broomfield, Colorado, United States
|
|-
|Win
|align=center|14–9
|Justin Graves
|TKO (punches)
|MCF: Notorious
|
|align=center|1
|align=center|3:49
|North Platte, Nebraska, United States
|
|-
|Win
|align=center|13–9
|Samuel Guillet
|KO (punches)
|TKO 28: Inevitable
|
|align=center|1
|align=center|0:12
|Montreal, Quebec, Canada
|
|-
|Win
|align=center|12–9
|Jeff Luhman
|TKO (punches)
|MCF: Genesis
|
|align=center|2
|align=center|4:44
|North Platte, Nebraska, United States
|
|-
|Loss
|align=center|11–9
|Alonzo Martinez
|Submission (guillotine choke)
|VFC 16: Kings
|
|align=center|2
|align=center|N/A
|Council Bluffs, Iowa, United States
|
|-
|Win
|align=center|11–8
|Alonzo Martinez
|TKO (punches)
|VFC 13: Redemption
|
|align=center|2
|align=center|4:59
|North Platte, Nebraska, United States
|
|-
|Win
|align=center|10–8
|Nick Boulware
|TKO (punches)
|IFC: Rumble on the River
|
|align=center|1
|align=center|N/A
|Kearney, Nebraska, United States
|
|-
|Loss
|align=center|9–8
|Chris Avila
|Submission (armbar)
|RITR: Rumble in the Rockies
|
|align=center|1
|align=center|4:39
|Colorado, United States
|
|-
|Loss
|align=center|9–7
|Alvin Robinson
|Submission (rear-naked choke)
|ROF 20: Elite
|
|align=center|1
|align=center|1:33
|Castle Rock, Colorado, United States
|
|-
|Win
|align=center|9–6
|David Moench
|Decision (unanimous)
|UCE: Round 17 - Finals
|
|align=center|3
|align=center|5:00
|Salt Lake City, Utah, United States
|
|-
|Win
|align=center|8–6
|James Martinez
|TKO (corner stoppage)
|ROF 18: River Valley Rumble
|
|align=center|1
|align=center|3:00
|North Platte, Nebraska, United States
|
|-
|Win
|align=center|7–6
|Vern Baca
|Submission (strikes)
|Ring of Fire 16
|
|align=center|2
|align=center|3:06
|Colorado, United States
|
|-
|Loss
|align=center|6–6
|Bart Palaszewski
|Submission (guillotine choke)
|Combat: Do Fighting Challenge 2
|
|align=center|N/A
|align=center|N/A
|Illinois, United States
|
|-
|Win
|align=center|6–5
|Tom Kirk
|TKO (punches)
|Combat: Do Fighting Challenge 1
|
|align=center|3
|align=center|N/A
|Cicero, Illinois, United States
|
|-
|Win
|align=center|5–5
|Tim Means
|TKO (injury)
|Ring of Fire 13
|
|align=center|1
|align=center|1:40
|Castle Rock, Colorado, United States
|
|-
|Win
|align=center|4–5
|James Martinez
|Decision (majority)
|ROF 12: Nemesis
|
|align=center|2
|align=center|5:00
|Castle Rock, Colorado, United States
|
|-
|Loss
|align=center|3–5
|John Strawn
|Submission (rear-naked choke)
|Extreme Challenge 57
|
|align=center|2
|align=center|1:57
|Council Bluffs, Iowa, United States
|
|-
|Loss
|align=center|3–4
|Jake Hudson
|Submission (keylock)
|VFC 7: Showdown
|
|align=center|1
|align=center|1:37
|Council Bluffs, Iowa, United States
|
|-
|Loss
|align=center|3–3
|Alonzo Martinez
|TKO (corner stoppage)
|VFC 6: Overload
|
|align=center|3
|align=center|2:32
|Council Bluffs, Iowa, United States
|
|-
|Win
|align=center|3–2
|Brock Jensen
|Decision (unanimous)
|ROF 10: Intensity
|
|align=center|3
|align=center|3:00
|Castle Rock, Colorado, United States
|
|-
|Win
|align=center|2–2
|Kendrick Johnson
|TKO (punches)
|Victory Fighting 5
|
|align=center|1
|align=center|0:26
|Council Bluffs, Iowa, United States
|
|-
|Loss
|align=center|1–2
|Tom Sarah
|Submission (triangle choke)
|ROF 8: Reckoning
|
|align=center|2
|align=center|1:31
|Castle Rock, Colorado, United States
|
|-
|Win
|align=center|1–1
|Steve Horton
|TKO (injury)
|VFC 4: Wildcard
|
|align=center|1
|align=center|0:52
|Council Bluffs, Iowa, United States
|
|-
|Loss
|align=center|0–1
|Brock Larson
|Submission (keylock)
|IWW - Iowa Winter Waters
|
|align=center|N/A
|align=center|N/A
|Spirit Lake, Iowa, United States
|
|-

References

External links

 

1980 births
Living people
American male mixed martial artists
Mixed martial artists from Nebraska
Lightweight mixed martial artists
Mixed martial artists utilizing Brazilian jiu-jitsu
American mixed martial artists of Mexican descent
People from North Platte, Nebraska
Ultimate Fighting Championship male fighters
American practitioners of Brazilian jiu-jitsu
People awarded a black belt in Brazilian jiu-jitsu